Ben Samuel Tulett (born 26 August 2001) is a British cyclo-cross and road cyclist, who currently rides for UCI WorldTeam . In 2018, he won the Junior World Cyclocross Championships in Valkenburg and repeated the feat 12 months later in Bogense.

Major results

Cyclo-cross

2017–2018
 1st  UCI World Junior Championships
 1st Junior Overijse
 1st Junior Sint-Niklaas
 Junior DVV Trophy
1st Koppenbergcross
3rd Flandriencross
 Junior National Trophy Series
1st Derby
1st Shrewsbury
3rd Abergavenny
 2nd National Junior Championships
 Junior Brico Cross
2nd Kruibeke
 UCI Junior World Cup
3rd Namur
 3rd  UEC European Junior Championships
2018–2019
 1st  UCI World Junior Championships
 1st  National Junior Championships
 Junior National Trophy Series
1st Derby
 UCI Junior World Cup
2nd Namur
 Junior Superprestige
2nd Zonhoven
2nd Diegem
 Junior DVV Trophy
2nd Azencross
 2nd Junior Overijse
2019–2020
 1st  National Under-23 Championships
 2nd National Championships

Road

2018
 1st  Road race, National Junior Championships
 1st  Overall Junior Tour of Wales
 3rd Overall Ronde des Vallées
2019
 4th Gent–Wevelgem Junioren
2020
 5th Overall Tour of Antalya
2021
 8th Coppa Ugo Agostoni
 9th Overall Tour de Pologne
2022
 2nd Overall Settimana Internazionale di Coppi e Bartali
1st  Young rider classification
1st Stage 3
 5th Overall Tour de Pologne
2023
 6th Clásica Jaén Paraíso Interior

Grand Tour results timeline

Classics results timeline

References

External links

2001 births
Living people
British male cyclists
Cyclo-cross cyclists
People from Sevenoaks
Sportspeople from Kent
21st-century British people